Events in the year 1975 in Portugal.

Incumbents
President: Francisco da Costa Gomes 
Prime Minister: Vasco Gonçalves (until 25 September), José Baptista Pinheiro de Azevedo (from 25 September)

Arts and entertainment
Portugal participated in the Eurovision Song Contest 1975, with Duarte Mendes and the song "Madrugada".

Sport
In association football, for the first-tier league seasons, see 1974–75 Primeira Divisão and 1975–76 Primeira Divisão; for the Taça de Portugal seasons, see 1974–75 Taça de Portugal and 1975–76 Taça de Portugal. 
 14 June - Taça de Portugal Final
Establishment of the Portuguese Handball Women's Cup.
Establishment of G.D. Tourizense.

References

 
Portugal
Portugal
Years of the 20th century in Portugal